The Joseph J. Cole Jr. House and 1925 Cole Brouette No. 70611 are a house and historic motor car located at 4909 N. Meridian Street in Indianapolis, Indiana.  The house, also known as Colehaven, dates from 1924 and reflects Late 19th and 20th Century Revivals architecture and French Renaissance architecture. The  property includes the house and one other contributing structure.

The house was constructed for Joseph J. Cole Jr., the president of the Cole Motor Car Company in Indianapolis. The Cole Brouette was produced at that factory and was owned by the Cole family.
The house and automobile were listed on the National Register of Historic Places in 1997.

See also
Cole Motor Car Company, also NRHP-listed in Indianapolis

References

Houses on the National Register of Historic Places in Indiana
Houses completed in 1924
French Renaissance architecture
Renaissance Revival architecture in Indiana
Historic district contributing properties in Indiana
Houses in Indianapolis
National Register of Historic Places in Indianapolis